

Countess of Holland

House of Holland, 875–1299

House of Avesnes, 1299–1354

House of Wittelsbach, 1354–1432

House of Valois-Burgundy, 1432–1482

House of Habsburg, 1482–1581

Titular Countess of Holland

House of Habsburg, 1581–1648 

During the 'foreign rule' by Burgundy and Habsburg, the county was governed by a stadtholder in name of the count. In 1581, the Estates General of the United Provinces declared themselves independent from the Spanish rule of Philip II (who was Philip III of Holland). Until the Treaty of Münster in 1648, the kings of Spain still used the title Count of Holland, but they had lost the actual power over the county to the States of Holland.

See also 
Countess of Hainault
Countess of Zeeland
List of Bavarian consorts
List of Dutch consorts

Sources 
HOLLAND

 
Holland